The Charmoise is a French breed of domestic sheep. It is reared for both meat and wool.

History 

Romney rams imported from Kent in the United Kingdom were cross-bred with ewes of local breeds including the Berrichon du Cher, Merino,  and Tourangelle, in the hope of combining the meat qualities of the former with the rusticity of the latter.

The breed was rapidly established, by 1820 at the latest. Its first appearance at an agricultural show was in 1852. In 1896 a breed society was established; in 1926 this was re-formed, and in 1927 the first volume of the flock-book was published. There were by this time some  head. Numbers increased further in the twentieth century, reaching a peak of approximately  head in the 1960s. These were widely distributed in south-west central France, in an area bounded roughly by the rivers Garonne to the south-west and Loire to the north and east, and concentrated particularly in the départements of Haute-Vienne and Vienne in the centre of that area.

In 2022 the conservation status of the Charmoise was listed by DAD-IS as 'not at risk'.

Characteristics 

The Charmoise is white-faced and white-woolled; it is polled in both sexes.

References 

Sheep breeds
Sheep breeds originating in France